Durio lowianus is a species of tree in the genus Durio. It is native from Peninsular Thailand to Sumatra.

References 

lowianus